Jason Edward Hunt (born 3 January 1970) is an Australian politician who currently serves as a Labor member of the Queensland Parliament for the seat of Caloundra since 2020.

After contesting in both the 2015 and 2017 elections, Hunt won the seat of Caloundra at the 2020 election, succeeding retiring LNP member Mark McArdle, and defeating the new LNP challenger Stuart Coward. It became the first time a Labor candidate had won the seat of Caloundra.

References 

Members of the Queensland Legislative Assembly
Australian Labor Party members of the Parliament of Queensland
1970 births
Living people
21st-century Australian politicians